Third World Child is a studio album by South African artist Johnny Clegg and his band Savuka, released in 1987 and produced by Hilton Rosenthal.

Incorporating both Zulu and English lyrics, as well as political songs, it was the album which led Clegg to international fame. All songs were written by Johnny Clegg, except for Giyani in collaboration with V. Mavusa.

The track "Scatterlings of Africa" gave them an entry in the UK Singles Chart, reaching No. 75 in May 1987, and was featured on the soundtrack of the 1988 film Rain Man.

The album has the same name as an earlier solo album "Third World Child" released by Clegg in 1985. The same title track appears on both albums but the other tracks are different.

The tracks Giyani, Shadile (Ring on her Finger) and Asimbonanga (Mandela) appeared previously on the EP "Johnny Clegg and Savuka" released in 1986.

Covers 
The song "Great Heart" was covered by Jimmy Buffett a year after its release for his album Hot Water and became an opener for Buffett's concerts, being played nearly every performance during the 2000 and 2003 tours.  The 2000 tour was compiled into a live album, Buffett Live: Tuesdays, Thursdays, Saturdays, but "Great Heart" was left on the cutting room floor.  However, many performances from the 2003 tour were captured on five out of seven of the Jimmy Buffett sound board live albums.  Buffett originally heard the song after listening to Johnny Clegg cassette tapes while in France.

Track listing
All tracks composed by Johnny Clegg; except where noted.

Personnel
Johnny Clegg – vocals, guitar, concertina, Umhuphe mouth bow
Savuka
Jabu Mavuso – bass guitar, vocals
Derek de Beer – drums, percussion, vocals
Keith Hutchinson – keyboards, flute, saxophone, vocals
Steve Mavuso – keyboards, vocals
Dudu Zulu – percussion, vocals
Additional personnel
Bobby Summerfield – mixer, recording engineer, keyboard and drum programming

Notes

Savuka albums
Capitol Records albums
1987 albums